Willis E. Donley (June 24, 1901 – June 6, 1985) was an American politician and lawyer.

Born in the Town of Frankfort, Pepin County, Wisconsin, Donley went to Durand High School. He then went to Ripon College and the Marquette University Law School. Donley then practiced law. In 1933, Donley served in the Wisconsin State Assembly and was a Democrat.

His son, Terrence Joseph Donley, was a career criminal, serving time for narcotics and cashing bad checks. One scam involved him claiming to be the son of Lowell Thomas. In the 1970s, Terrence Donley worked as an undercover operative for Wisconsin Attorney General Robert Warren. In 1983, he came forward, claiming that Warren had ordered him to commit illegal acts in order to frame Mafia chieftain Frank Balistrieri.

Notes

1901 births
1985 deaths
People from Pepin County, Wisconsin
Ripon College (Wisconsin) alumni
Marquette University Law School alumni
Wisconsin lawyers
20th-century American politicians
20th-century American lawyers
Democratic Party members of the Wisconsin State Assembly